Scott Winfield Bond, also known as the "Black Rockefeller" (March 15, 1852March 24, 1933), was an African-American businessman in Arkansas known for his work in agricultural real estate, merchandising, and factory production in St. Francis County. Born into slavery, he eventually became the state's first Black millionaire, worth over $2M by the age of 60.

He was a member of Booker T. Washington's National Negro Business League, and his relationship with the Black Catholic journalist Daniel Rudd was also notable, as Rudd came to Arkansas to work for him later in life.

Bond died at the age of 81 in a farm accident, wherein he was gored to death by an ox.

Personal life 
He was married to Magnolia Nash and had 11 sons: Waverly, Theophilus, Raphe, Scott Jr., John, Herman, Buford, Cody, Odie, Ulysses, and Leander.

After Bond's death, Theophilus would team with Daniel Rudd to write his biography, From Slavery to Wealth.

Scott Bond Burial Plot 

Bond's family burial plot was listed on the National Register of Historic Places in 2002.

References 

African-American businesspeople
African-American business executives
African-American history of Arkansas
African-American upper class
People from St. Francis County, Arkansas
People from Madison County, Mississippi